Mid-stream operation is the operation of loading and unloading cargo containers at the container ship while at sea, with barges or dumb steel lighters performing the transfer, distribution or landing of containers to piers nearby.

Although mid-stream operation has the significant advantage of low costs, it has been criticized for its dangerous operation where cargoes are transferred between two ships on sea, which make it very difficult to operate.

Hong Kong operations
Mid-stream operation has been abandoned almost everywhere except Hong Kong, where land is insufficient and the fees for using the container pier are quite high. In Hong Kong, mid-stream operations occur at 12 different locations occupying a total land area of 34.6 hectares and water frontage of 3,513 metres.

Operators include:
 Fat Kee Stevedores Ltd.
 Tai Wah Sea/Land Heavy Transportation Ltd.
 Transward Ltd.

See also
 Ship-to-ship cargo transfer
 Underway replenishment
 Port of Hong Kong
 Stevedore

External links
 Mid-stream operation in Hong Kong
 List of 

Freight transport
Transport in Hong Kong